Ricardo Torres Origel (8 September 1956 – 24 April 2016) was a Mexican politician affiliated with the PAN. He served as a Senator of the LX and LXI Legislatures of the Mexican Congress representing Guanajuato. He also served as federal deputy during the LVIII Legislature, as well as a local deputy in the LVII Legislature of the Congress of Guanajuato.

References

1956 births
2016 deaths
Politicians from Guanajuato
People from León, Guanajuato
Members of the Senate of the Republic (Mexico)
Members of the Chamber of Deputies (Mexico)
National Action Party (Mexico) politicians
20th-century Mexican politicians
21st-century Mexican politicians
Members of the Congress of Guanajuato